The Reverend Geoffrey J. Paxton has been an ordained minister in the Anglican Church of Australia. He is a graduate of Australian College of Theology and the University of Queensland. He tutored in the history of Christian thought at the University of Queensland, and in Greek and New Testament studies in the Brisbane College of Theology. Paxton traveled extensively in the United States, Britain, South Africa, the Philippines and New Zealand lecturing in Reformation theology. He has also held classes on homiletics (preaching) for over a decade.

Biography 
Paxton served as the first resident minister at The Gap Anglican Church in Brisbane, and was principal of the Queensland Bible Institute (now Brisbane School of Theology) in Brisbane, Australia for 7 years. The Malny Anglican Church bulletin for May 15, 2016 lists a Reverend Geoffrey Paxton as deceased that year; whether this is the same Paxton or not is uncertain.

Interaction with Adventists 
Paxton has had significant interaction with the Seventh-day Adventist Church, and a "keen interest" in its theology. This began through his acquaintance with Robert Brinsmead, as both were critical of the charismatic movement. One source described the pair as "anti-Charismatic crusaders" after one meeting. They held public meetings supporting belief in justification by faith alone. Paxton contributed to Brinsmead's Present Truth Magazine.

He published The Shaking of Adventism in 1977, about the struggle within the Adventist church over what it means to be saved, and also over the nature of Christ. It evaluates the Adventist claim to being heirs of the Protestant Reformation. The title comes from the traditional concept in Adventism of a "shaking" time.

The Adventist magazine Spectrum devoted a special section to the book (see below). Also Adventist Richard Rice affirmed the book's review of past and then-present views of salvation in Adventism as "well informed and generally accurate", yet claims the standard by which Paxton compares Adventist views as "artificial". He says, "Paxton reads more into their claim to be heirs of the Reformation than most Adventists do," and "the Reformers themselves held that justification and sanctification are inseparable."

Paxton lost his job at the Bible school because of his association with Adventists, or as Desmond Ford puts it, "because of his refusal to lay aside his interest in the Adventist 'cult'."

See also 
 Seventh-day Adventist interfaith relations

References 

Other resources:
 Erwin R. Gane. Review  (DjVu) of The Shaking of Adventism. Andrews University Seminary Studies Autumn 1978, v16, p420–22

External links 
 The Shaking of Adventism by Paxton, reprinted on the Present Truth Magazine website (formerly of Robert Brinsmead). Grand Rapids, Michigan: Baker Book House, 1977
 "A Discussion of Holiness Theology: Summary of an Interview with Geoffrey J. Paxton". Present Truth Magazine, vol. 6
 The 9:3 (July 1978) issue of Spectrum ran a "Special Section: The Shaking of Adventism?":
 "A View from the Outside" by Fritz Guy
 "Paxton’s Misunderstanding of Adventism" by Herbert Douglass
 "The Truth of Paxton’s Thesis" by Desmond Ford
 "Paxton and the Reformers" by Hans LaRondelle
 "An Interview with Paxton" by Jonathan M. Butler, p58–60
 Responses: "On Paxton", letters to the editor from Richard B. Lewis, George W. Colvin, Jr. and Eric C. Webster. Spectrum 9:4, p63–64.
 Responses: "On Paxton", letters to the editor from Douglas Hackleman and (brief) Thomas J. Zwemer. Spectrum 10:1, p60–63

Australian Anglican priests
Living people
Year of birth missing (living people)